Siololovau Ikavuka (born 8 February 1968) is a Tongan athlete. She competed in the women's shot put and the women's discus throw at the 1988 Summer Olympics. She was the first woman to represent Tonga at the Olympics.

References

External links
 

1968 births
Living people
Athletes (track and field) at the 1988 Summer Olympics
Tongan female shot putters
Tongan female discus throwers
Olympic athletes of Tonga
Place of birth missing (living people)